XHAGR-FM 105.5/XEAGR-AM 810 is a combo radio station in Acapulco, Guerrero. It is owned by and carries the Radio Fórmula network.

History
XEAGR received its first concession on January 25, 1994. It was originally owned by Radio Creatividad, S.A., a subsidiary of Radiorama. That November, the station was authorized for its FM combo, XHAGR-FM 105.5. In 2000, Radio Fórmula bought the station.

References

Spanish-language radio stations
Radio stations in Guerrero
Radio stations established in 1994
Radio Fórmula
1994 establishments in Mexico